Ichthyomys is a genus of semiaquatic Neotropical rodents in the family Cricetidae.
It contains the following species:
 Crab-eating rat (Ichthyomys hydrobates)
 Pittier's crab-eating rat (I. pittieri)
 Stolzmann's crab-eating rat (I. stolzmanni)
 Tweedy's crab-eating rat (I. tweedii)

Members of the genus tend to be nocturnal and live along fast-flowing streams, where they feed on freshwater invertebrates such as crabs.

References

 
Rodent genera
Taxa named by Oldfield Thomas
Taxonomy articles created by Polbot